Live at the Village Vanguard is a live album by pianist Geri Allen, bassist Charlie Haden and drummer Paul Motian. It was recorded in 1990 at the Village Vanguard and released on the Japanese DIW label.

Reception 

AllMusic awarded the album 4 stars, stating, "Live at the Village Vanguard is a good CD musically, but there's not much jump-up factor here -- it's moody and very bluesy in feeling if not actual form, almost like chamber jazz at times. The very compressed, muted recorded sound doesn't alleviate the somber aspect of the listening experience any, but jazz is about capturing the moment. And those were the moments, emotional and musical, caught by these three master musicians on those two December nights".

The authors of the Penguin Guide to Jazz Recordings awarded the album 4 stars, and wrote: "Live is both accessible and inexhaustible, making its appeal at all sorts of unexpected levels... Even allowing for the head start of Keith Jarrett's 'Standards' trio, this is probably the best piano-led group currently working."

Track listing 
All compositions by Geri Allen except as indicated
 "A Prayer for Peace" – 6:32
 "Obtuse Angles" – 6:07
 "It Should Have Happened a Long Time Ago" (Paul Motian) - 7:11
 "For Turiya" (Charlie Haden) - 1:01
 "Fiasco" (Motian) - 8:23
 "In the Year of the Dragon" (Motian) - 7:41
 "Vanguard Blues" (Haden) - 7:43
 "Mumbo Jumbo" (Motian) - 9:28
 "Song for the Whales" (Haden) - 7:59

Personnel 
 Geri Allen - piano
 Charlie Haden - bass 
 Paul Motian - drums

References 

1991 live albums
Geri Allen live albums
DIW Records live albums
Albums recorded at the Village Vanguard
Charlie Haden live albums
Paul Motian live albums
Live instrumental albums